Marion Barney (1879 - 1968) was an American character actress known for her long association with the radio programs of Elaine Sterne Carrington.

A native of San Francisco, Barney attended the University of California, Berkeley, at the same time honing her skills in local theatrical societies. In the first years of the 20th century she toured with a variety of stage productions, eventually gaining work on Broadway in supporting roles. From 1908 until 1913 she was leading lady of the Orpheum Players at Philadelphia's Chestnut Street Theatre. In 1919 she abandoned the stage temporarily to make silent films, completing ten before returning to Broadway the following year. In the 1930s Barney turned her attention to radio, beginning with the title role of an NBC Blue summer program titled Tish in 1932. For Carrington she was a series regular, most notably playing matronly characters in  Rosemary, Pepper Young's Family, and When a Girl Marries. Other radio programs on which she appeared included:
The Chase Twins
Gangbusters
Home of the Brave
Neighbors
Pages of Romance
Peables Takes Charge
Special Investigator
We the People

She also appeared in another Carrington serial, Marriage for Two. Well-regarded for her work in summer stock, Barney was said to be possessed of a sharp memory which aided her in performance.

References

1879 births
1968 deaths
American stage actresses
American film actresses
American radio actresses
20th-century American actresses
Actresses from San Francisco
University of California, Berkeley alumni